Berentine Island is the southernmost island in Kong Ludvigøyane, part of Thousand Islands, an island group south of Edgeøya in Svalbard, Norway.

References

 Norwegian Polar Institute Place Names of Svalbard Database

Islands of Svalbard